The Demetae were a Celtic people of Iron Age and Roman period, who inhabited modern Pembrokeshire and Carmarthenshire in south-west Wales, and gave their name to the county of Dyfed.

Classical references
They are mentioned in Ptolemy's Geographia, as being west of the Silures. He mentions two of their towns, Moridunum (modern Carmarthen) and Luentinum (identified as the Dolaucothi Gold Mines near Pumsaint, Carmarthenshire). They are not mentioned in Tacitus' accounts of Roman warfare in Wales, which concentrate on their neighbours the Silures and Ordovices.

Vortiporius, "tyrant of the Demetae", is one of the kings condemned by Gildas in his 6th century polemic De Excidio et Conquestu Britanniae. This probably signifies the sub-Roman petty kingdom of Dyfed.

Etymology and relationship to Dyfed
The Latinized element Demet has a clear and well attested relationship with the Welsh Dyfed (proto-Celtic *dametos) and even after the imposition of the English Shire system the use of the name Dyfed for the former tribal lands continued unabated. Unsuccessful attempts were made in the 19th-century to link the etymon with the later kingdom of Deheubarth. A more plausible relationship with the word defaid (English: sheep) was suggested by 1832 as Dyfed remained "a country fit for the pasture of sheep" and local people were noted for their cultivation of large numbers of sheep and goats from ancient times.

References

Dyfed
History of Pembrokeshire
Prehistoric Wales
Celtic Britons
Historical Celtic peoples